2017 Tommy & More was a United Kingdom 7-date concert tour by British band The Who. The first two nights saw the band performing live in its entirety their 1969 studio album Tommy along with a few classics, with the rest of the tour featuring an extended Tommy set as a centerpiece to an otherwise greatest hits show.

Tour band
The Who
Roger Daltrey – lead vocals, harmonica, acoustic guitar, tambourine
Pete Townshend – lead guitar, acoustic guitar, vocals

Backing musicians
Zak Starkey – drums, percussion
Simon Townshend – rhythm guitar, acoustic guitar, vocals
Jon Button – bass guitar
Frank Simes – keyboards, backing vocals, percussion, banjo, mandolin
John Corey – keyboards, backing vocals, percussion, bass harmonica
Loren Gold – keyboards, backing vocals, jaw harp

Set list

Show on 30 March 2017 at the Royal Albert Hall 
This set list is representative of the Teenage Cancer Trust Benefit performance on 30 March 2017 at the Royal Albert Hall, London, UK. It does not represent all concerts for the duration of the tour.

"I Can't Explain"
"Substitute"
"Overture"
"It's a Boy"
"1921"
"Amazing Journey"
"Sparks"
"Eyesight to the Blind"
"Christmas"
"Cousin Kevin"
"The Acid Queen"
"Do You Think It's Alright?"
"Fiddle About"
"Pinball Wizard"
"There's a Doctor"
"Go to the Mirror!"
"Tommy Can You Hear Me?"
"Smash the Mirror"
"Underture"
"I'm Free"
"Miracle Cure"
"Sensation"
"Sally Simpson"
"Welcome"
"Tommy's Holiday Camp"
"We're Not Gonna Take It" / "See Me, Feel Me"
"Won't Get Fooled Again"
"Join Together"
"Baba O'Riley"
"Who Are You"

Show on 1 April 2017 at the Royal Albert Hall 
This set list is representative of the Teenage Cancer Trust Benefit performance on 1 April 2017 at the Royal Albert Hall, London, UK. It does not represent all concerts for the duration of the tour. This show was officially released on 13 October 2017 as Tommy - Live At The Royal Albert Hall on various formats (2 CD Digipack / 3 Vinyls Gatefold / 1 DVD / 1 Blu-ray).

"Overture"
"It's a Boy"
"1921"
"Amazing Journey"
"Sparks"
"Eyesight to the Blind"
"Christmas"
"Cousin Kevin"
"The Acid Queen"
"Do You Think It's Alright?"
"Fiddle About"
"Pinball Wizard"
"There's a Doctor"
"Go to the Mirror!"
"Tommy Can You Hear Me?"
"Smash the Mirror"
"Underture"
"I'm Free"
"Miracle Cure"
"Sensation"
"Sally Simpson"
"Welcome"
"Tommy's Holiday Camp"
"We're Not Gonna Take It" / "See Me, Feel Me"
"I Can't Explain"
"Join Together"
"I Can See For Miles"
"Who Are You"
"Love, Reign o'er Me"
"Baba O'Riley"
"Won't Get Fooled Again"

Tour dates
Source:

Notes

References

External links
The Who Online Concert Guide

The Who concert tours
2017 concert tours